Giovanni Antonio Gallo (died 1543) was a Roman Catholic prelate who served as Bishop of Calvi Risorta (1519–1543).

Biography
On 9 August 1519, Giovanni Antonio Gallo was appointed by Pope Leo X as Bishop of Calvi Risorta.
He served as Bishop of Calvi Risorta until his death in 1543.

References

External links and additional sources
 (for Chronology of Bishops) 
 (for Chronology of Bishops) 

16th-century Italian Roman Catholic bishops
1543 deaths
Bishops appointed by Pope Leo X